The 2016–17 Blackwater Elite season was the third season of the franchise in the Philippine Basketball Association (PBA).

Key dates

2016
October 30: The 2016 PBA draft took place at Midtown Atrium, Robinson Place Manila.

Draft picks

Special draft

Regular draft

Roster

Philippine Cup

Eliminations

Standings

Game log

|- style="background:#cfc;"
| 1
| November 23
| Phoenix
| W 94–87
| Mac Belo (17)
| Arthur dela Cruz (10)
| John Pinto (7)
| Smart Araneta Coliseum
| 1–0
|- style="background:#cfc;"
| 2
| November 27
| Meralco
| W 86–84
| Mac Belo (25)
| Raymond Aguilar (7)
| Denok Miranda (7)
| Smart Araneta Coliseum
| 2–0

|- style="background:#fcc;"
| 3
| December 2
| TNT
| L 92–99
| Mac Belo (21)
| Belo, dela Cruz (9)
| dela Cruz, Pinto (6)
| Smart Araneta Coliseum
| 2–1
|- style="background:#fcc;"
| 4
| December 9
| Rain or Shine
| L 93–107
| Raymond Aguilar (15)
| Mac Belo (9)
| Denok Miranda (5)
| Smart Araneta Coliseum
| 2–2
|- style="background:#cfc;"
| 5
| December 14
| NLEX
| W 96–85
| Arthur dela Cruz (18)
| John Pinto (13)
| Belo, Buenafe (5)
| Smart Araneta Coliseum
| 3–2
|- style="background:#cfc;"
| 6
| December 21
| GlobalPort
| W 99–91
| Mac Belo (20)
| Buenafe, Belo (6)
| John Pinto (6)
| Filoil Flying V Centre
| 4–2
|- style="background:#fcc;"
| 7
| December 25
| Mahindra
| L 93–97 (OT)
| Arthur dela Cruz (18)
| Mac Belo (9)
| John Pinto (7)
| Philippine Arena
| 4–3

|- style="background:#fcc;"
| 8
| January 6
| San Miguel
| L 93–118
| Arthur dela Cruz (16)
| John Pinto (10)
| John Pinto (7)
| Mall of Asia Arena
| 4–4
|- style="background:#cfc;"
| 9
| January 15
| Alaska
| W 103–100
| Mac Belo (21)
| Mac Belo (7)
| John Pinto (5)
| Smart Araneta Coliseum
| 5–4
|- style="background:#fcc;"
| 10
| January 20
| Barangay Ginebra
| L 90–99
| Roi Sumang (20)
| Arthur dela Cruz (12)
| Arthur dela Cruz (5)
| Cuneta Astrodome
| 5–5
|- style="background:#fcc;"
| 11
| January 25
| Star
| L 95–111
| Arthur dela Cruz (23)
| James Sena (11)
| John Pinto (7)
| Cuneta Astrodome
| 5–6

Playoffs

Bracket

Game log

|- style="background:#fcc;"
| 1
| February 3
| Rain or Shine
| L 80–103
| Arthur dela Cruz (20)
| Arthur dela Cruz (9)
| Buenafe, Pinto (4)
| Smart Araneta Coliseum
| 0–1

Commissioner's Cup

Eliminations

Standings

Game log

|- style="background:#fcc;"
| 1
| March 18
| Phoenix
| L 116–118 (2OT)
| Greg Smith (37)
| Greg Smith (30)
| Roi Sumang (6)
| Cuneta Astrodome
| 0–1
|- style="background:#fcc;"
| 2
| March 22
| Alaska
| L 95–109
| Reil Cervantes (21)
| Greg Smith (16)
| Greg Smith (6)
| Smart Araneta Coliseum
| 0–2
|- style="background:#fcc;"
| 3
| March 26
| Rain or Shine
| L 88–95
| Greg Smith (34)
| Greg Smith (20)
| Roi Sumang (5)
| Ynares Center
| 0–3
|- style="background:#fcc;"
| 4
| March 31
| TNT
| L 89–92
| Greg Smith (22) 
| Greg Smith (31)
| Smith, Sumang (3)
| Smart Araneta Coliseum
| 0–4

|- style="background:#cfc;"
| 5
| April 8
| GlobalPort
| W 118–113
| Greg Smith (40)
| Greg Smith (19)
| Pinto, Smith (4)
| Mall of Asia Arena
| 1–4
|- style="background:#fcc;"
| 6
| April 16
| Meralco
| L 91–102
| Greg Smith (19)
| Greg Smith (14)
| Pinto, Smith (7)
| Smart Araneta Coliseum
| 1–5
|- style="background:#fcc;"
| 7
| April 22
| Star
| L 90–96
| KG Canaleta (27)
| Greg Smith (29)
| John Pinto (7)
| Mall of Asia Arena
| 1–6
|- align="center"
|colspan="9" bgcolor="#bbcaff"|All-Star Break

|- style="background:#cfc;"
| 8
| May 3
| NLEX
| W 104–98
| Canaleta, Smith (24)
| Greg Smith (18)
| Greg Smith (7)
| Smart Araneta Coliseum
| 2–6
|- style="background:#fcc;"
| 9
| May 7
| Mahindra
| L 87–96
| Greg Smith (29)
| Greg Smith (25)
| Greg Smith (6)
| Smart Araneta Coliseum
| 2–7
|- style="background:#fcc;"
| 10
| May 26
| Barangay Ginebra
| L 82–96
| Greg Smith (35)
| Greg Smith (14)
| Cruz, Smith (6)
| Alonte Sports Arena
| 2–8
|- style="background:#fcc;"
| 11
| May 31
| San Miguel
| L 113–124
| Greg Smith (21)
| Greg Smith (22)
| Mark Cruz (6)
| Cuneta Astrodome
| 2–9

Governors' Cup

Eliminations

Standings

Game log

|- style="background:#fcc;"
| 1
| July 19
| Meralco
| L 78–107
| Trevis Simpson (25)
| Trevis Simpson (8)
| John Pinto (3)
| Smart Araneta Coliseum
| 0–1
|- style="background:#fcc;"
| 2
| July 23
| Star
| L 86–103
| Trevis Simpson (24)
| John Paul Erram (15)
| Trevis Simpson (2)
| Smart Araneta Coliseum
| 0–2
|- style="background:#fcc;"
| 3
| July 29
| San Miguel
| L 93–118
| Michael DiGregorio (18)
| John Paul Erram (15)
| Gamalinda, Sumang (4)
| Ynares Center
| 0–3

|- style="background:#cfc;"
| 4
| August 6
| Phoenix
| W 92–86
| Henry Walker (32)
| Henry Walker (15)
| Henry Walker (5)
| Smart Araneta Coliseum
| 1–3
|- style="background:#cfc;"
| 5
| August 18
| NLEX
| W 107–106
| Roi Sumang (32)
| Henry Walker (15)
| Henry Walker (6)
| Smart Araneta Coliseum
| 2–3
|- style="background:#cfc;"
| 6
| August 23
| Alaska
| W 111–106 (2OT)
| Henry Walker (35)
| Henry Walker (32)
| Cruz, Sumang (5)
| Smart Araneta Coliseum
| 3–3
|- style="background:#fcc;"
| 7
| August 30
| TNT
| L 96–117
| Henry Walker (33)
| Henry Walker (18)
| John Pinto (5)
| Mall of Asia Arena
| 3–4

|- style="background:#cfc;"
| 8
| September 1
| Kia
| W 118–97
| Henry Walker (25)
| John Paul Erram (14)
| Henry Walker (7)
| Ynares Center
| 4–4
|- style="background:#fcc;"
| 9
| September 8
| Barangay Ginebra
| L 81–98
| Henry Walker (26)
| Henry Walker (17)
| Roi Sumang (5)
| Mall of Asia Arena
| 4–5
|- style="background:#cfc;" 
| 10
| September 17
| GlobalPort
| W 118–107
| Allein Maliksi (22)
| Henry Walker (13)
| Henry Walker (9)
| Ynares Center
| 5–5
|- style="background:#fcc;" 
| 11
| September 23
| Rain or Shine
| L 98–122
| Allein Maliksi (29)
| Henry Walker (13)
| Henry Walker (5)
| Smart Araneta Coliseum 
| 5–6

Playoffs

Bracket

Game log

|- style="background:#cfc;"
| 1
| September 26
| Meralco
| W 92–91
| Henry Walker (30)
| Henry Walker (18)
| Henry Walker (6)
| Mall of Asia Arena
| 1–0
|- style="background:#fcc;"
| 2
| September 28
| Meralco
| L 96–104
| Henry Walker (34)
| Henry Walker (16)
| Roi Sumang (8)
| Smart Araneta Coliseum
| 1–1

Transactions

Free Agency

Addition

Trades

Off-season

Commissioner's Cup

Governors' Cup

Recruited imports

Awards

References

Blackwater Bossing seasons
Blackwater Elite season